Ophichthus tchangi is an eel in the family Ophichthidae (worm/snake eels). It was described by Tang Wen-Qiao and Zhang Chun-Guang in 2002. It is a marine, subtropical eel which is known from the eastern China Sea, in the northwestern Pacific Ocean.

References

Taxa named by Tang Wen-Qiao
Taxa named by Zhang Chun-Guang
Fish described in 2002
tchanghi